This is a list of trade unions in the United Kingdom formed under UK labour law. The criteria for being an independent trade union, free from employer influence and domination, are set out in the Trade Union and Labour Relations (Consolidation) Act 1992 section 5. The body which oversees unions, and awards a certificate of independence for the purpose of collective bargaining is the Trades Union Certification Officer.  For the context and history see Trade unions in the United Kingdom.

Union confederations
 General Federation of Trade Unions (GFTU)
 Scottish Trades Union Congress (STUC)
 Trades Union Congress (TUC)

Independent unions
The following is a list of trade unions that are Certificated as independent by the Certification Officer, as of 14 July 2020.

Other independent unions

 Accord
 Advance
 Affinity
 Artists’ Union England
 Associated Train Crew Union
 Association for Clinical Biochemistry
 Association of Educational Psychologists
 Association of Local Authority Chief Executives
 Association of Revenue and Customs
 Association of School and College Leaders
 Britannia Staff Union
 British Association of Dental Nurses
 British Association of Journalists
 British Association of Occupational Therapists
 British Dental Association
 British Dietetic Association
 British Orthoptic Society
 Chartered Society of Physiotherapy
 Ellington Branch of the North East Area of the National Union of Mineworkers*
 FDA
 Fire Officers Association
 Guild of Professional Teachers of Dance, Movement to Music and Dramatic Arts
 Immigration Service Union (ISU)
 Independent Democratic Union
 Independent Pilots Association
 Institute of Journalists Trade Union
 International Transport Workers Federation*
 Leek United Building Society Staff Association
 National Association of Co-operative Officials
 National Association of Head Teachers
 National Association of NFU Group Secretaries
 National Association of Stable Staff
 National Crime Officers Association
 National Society for Education in Art and Design
 Nationwide Group Staff Union
 Pharmacists' Defence Association Union (PDA Union)
 PPU
 Prison Governors Association
 Retail Book Stationery and Allied Trades Employees Association
 Retained Firefighters Union
 Royal College of Midwives
 Sales Staff Association
 SKYSHARE
 Social Workers Union (SWU)
 Society of Authors
 Society of Union Employees (UNISON)
 Staff Union West Bromwich Building Society
 Union of Democratic Mineworkers
 United Road Transport Union
 VOICE
 Workers Uniting
 Workers of England Union

Scotland only
 Aegis the Union
 Association of Headteachers and Deputes in Scotland
 Scottish Secondary Teachers' Association
 United and Independent Union

Northern Ireland only
 Belfast Airport Police Association
 Financial Services Union
 Independent Workers Union
 Irish National Teachers' Organisation
 Lough Neagh Fishermen's Association
 Northern Ireland Public Service Alliance
 SIPTU (Services, Industrial, Professional & Technical Union)
 Ulster Teachers' Union

Non-independent unions
The following is a list of trade unions that have not been certificated as independent by the Certification Officer 31 March 2017.

 App Drivers & Couriers Union (ADCU)
 Alliance for Finance
 ASPSU
 Association of Flight Attendants*
 Association of Somerset Inseminators
 Association of Trade Union Political and Public Sector Staff*
 Balfour Beatty Group Staff Association
 Blue Chip Staff Association
 Boots Pharmacists Association
 City Screen Staff Forum
 Confederation of Shipbuilding and Engineering Unions*
 Criminal Justice Workers Union*
 Currys Supply Chain Staff Association
 Disabled Workers Union
 Employees Representatives*
 Employees United
 Federation of Entertainment Unions*
 G4S Care and Justice Services Staff Association
 General Federation of Trade Unions
 Headmasters' and Headmistresses' Conference
 Independent Workers Union of Great Britain
 Institute of Football Management and Administration
 International Transport Workers Federation*
 Leeds Building Society Colleague Association
 Leicestershire Overmen Deputies and Shotfirers Association
 Locum Doctors Association
 MyUnion
 National House Building Council Staff Association
 News Union
 North of England Zoological Society Staff Association
 Palm Paper Staff Association
 Professional Cricketers' Association
 Professional Footballers' Association
 Professional Footballers' Association Scotland*
 RSPB Staff Association
 Rugby Players Association
 Scottish Colliery Enginemen Boilermen and Tradesmens Association*
 Society of Local Council Clerks*
 Union of Country Sports Workers
 United Voices of the World
 Warwick International Staff Association
 Welsh Rugby Players Association

Scotland only
 Association of College Staff Scotland
 Independent Federation of Nursing in Scotland
 Professional Footballers' Association Scotland*
 Scottish Artists Union
 Scottish Colliery Enginemen Boilermen and Tradesmens Association*

Northern Ireland
 IMPACT

Historical unions

 Altogether Builders' Labourers and Constructional Workers' Society
 Amalgamated Association of Carters and Motormen
 Amalgamated Carters, Lorrymen and Motormen's Union
 Amalgamated Engineering and Electrical Union (AEEU)
 Amalgamated Marine Workers' Union (AMWU)
 Amalgamated Society of Carpenters and Joiners (ASCJ)
 Amalgamated Society of Engineers, Machinists, Millwrights, Smiths and Pattern Makers (ASE)
 Amalgamated Society of Foremen Lightermen of River Thames
 Amalgamated Society of Watermen, Lightermen and Bargemen
 Associated Horsemen's Union
 Association of Cinematograph Television and Allied Technicians (ACTT, now in BECTU)
 Association of Coastwise Masters, Mates and Engineers
 Association of University Teachers AUT
 Association of Principal Fire Officers
 Association of Professional Ambulance Personnel
 Belfast Breadservers' Association
 Belfast Journeymen Butchers' Association
 Belfast Operative Bakers' Union
 British Association of Colliery Management
 British Seafarers' Union (BSU)
 Broadcasting, Entertainment, Cinematograph and Theatre Union
 Burnley, Nelson, Rossendale and District Textile Workers' Union
 Cardiff, Penarth and Barry Coal Trimmers' Union
 Chemical Workers' Union
 Civil and Public Services Association (CPSA)
 Community and Youth Workers' Union
 Confederation of Health Service Employees (COHSE)
 Connect (???–2010) (now in Prospect)
 Cumberland Enginemen, Boilermen and Electrical Workers' Union
 Dock, Wharf, Riverside and General Labourers' Union (DWRGLU)
 Dundee Pilots
 Electricity Supply Staff Association (Dublin)
 Federation of Professional Railway Staff
 File Grinders' Society
 Gibraltar Apprentices and Ex-Apprentices Union
 Gibraltar Confederation of Labour
 Gibraltar Labour Trades Union
 Government Civil Employees' Association
 Grangemouth Pilots' Association
 Greenock Sugar Porters' Association
 Grimsby Steam and Diesel Fishing Vessels Engineers' and Firemen's Union
 Halifax and District Carters' and Motormen's Association
 Humber Amalgamated Steam Trawlers' Engineers, and Firemen's Union
 Imperial War Graves Commission Staff Association
 Institution of Professional Civil Servants
 Irish Mental Hospital Workers' Union
 Irish Union of Hairdressers and Allied Workers
 Iron and Steel Trades Confederation (ISTC)
 Iron, Steel and Wood Barge Builders and Helpers Association
 Labour Protection League
 Leith and Granston Pilots
 Liverpool and District Carters' and Motormen's Union
 London Co-operative Mutuality Club Collectors' Association
 Lurgan Hemmers' Veiners' and General Workers' Union
 Manchester Ship Canal Pilots' Association
 Manufacturing Science and Finance (MSF)
 Methil Pilots
 National Amalgamated Coal Workers' Union
 National Amalgamated Labourers' Union
 National Amalgamated Stevedores' and Dockers' Society
 National Amalgamated Union of Enginemen, Firemen, Mechanics, Motormen and Electrical Workers
 National Association of Colliery Overmen, Deputies and Shotfirers
 National Association of Colliery Overmen, Deputies and Shotfirers (South Wales Area)
 National Association of Local Government Officers (NALGO, now in UNISON)
 National Association of Operative Plasterers
 National Association of Teachers in Further and Higher Education NATFHE (www.natfhe.org.uk). Now amalgamated into the University and College Union (www.ucu.org.uk), along with the AUT
 National Association of Youth Hostel Wardens
 National Federation of SubPostmasters
 National Glass Bottle Makers' Society
 National Glass Workers' Trade Protection Association
 National Union of British Fishermen
 National Union of Agricultural and Allied Workers
 National Union of Civil and Public Servants (NUCPS)
 National Union of Co-operative Insurance Society Employees
 National Union of Dock Labourers (NUDL)
 National Union of Docks, Wharves and Shipping Staffs
 National Union of Dyers, Bleachers and Textile Workers
 National Union of Knitwear, Footwear & Apparel Trades (KFAT)
 Miners' Federation of Great Britain
 National Union of Public Employees (NUPE)
 National Union of Railwaymen (NUR)
 National Union of Seamen (NUS)
 National Union of Shale Miners and Oil Workers
 National Union of Ships' Clerks, Grain Weighers and Coalmeters
 National Union of Ship's Stewards (NUSSCBB)
 National Union of Vehicle Builders
 National Union of Vehicle Workers
 National Winding and General Engineers' Society
 North of England Engineers' and Firemen's Amalgamation
 North of England Trimmers' and Teemers Association
 North of Ireland Operative Butchers' and Allied Workers' Association
 North of Scotland Horse and Motormen's Association
 North Wales Craftsmen and General Workers' Union
 North Wales Quarrymen's Union
 Northern Carpet Trades Union
 Northern Ireland Textile Workers' Union
 Northern Textile and Allied Workers' Union
 Operative Bricklayers' Society (OBS)
 Port of Liverpool Staff Association
 Port of London Deal Porters' Union
 Portadown Textile Workers' Union
 Power Loom Tenters' Trade Union of Ireland
 Process and General Workers' Union
 Radcliffe and District Enginemen and Boilermen's Provident Society
 Scottish Busmen's Union
 Scottish Commercial Motormen's Union
 Scottish Farm Servants' Association
 Scottish Primary Teachers' Association (2011–2012)
 Scottish Seafishers' Union
 Scottish Slaters, Tilers, Roofers and Cement Workers' Society
 Scottish Textile Workers' Union
 Scottish Transport and General Workers' Union (Docks)
 Scottish Union of Dock Labourers (SUDL)
 Sheffield Amalgamated Union of File Trades
 Shield Guarding Staff Association
 Staff Association for Royal Automobile Club Employees
 Staff Association of Bank of Baroda (UK Region)
 SURGE (Skipton Union Representing Group Employees)
 Technical, Administrative and Supervisory Section, now part of Amicus
 Union of Bookmakers Employees
 Union of Kodak Workers
 United Cut Nail Makers of Great Britain Protection Society
 UFS
 United Fishermen's Union
 United Order of General Labourers
 United Vehicle Workers
 Unity
 Watermen, Lightermen, Tugmen and Bargemen's Union
 Weaver Watermen's Association
 Whatman Staff Association
 Workers' Union
 Yorkshire Independent Staff Association

See also

 FTSE 100 and FT 30
 Labour Party (UK) affiliated trade union
 List of hedge funds
 List of largest United Kingdom employers
 List of students' unions in the United Kingdom
 List of trade unions in Germany
 List of trade unions in the United States
 List of Transport and General Workers' Union amalgamations
 List of unions
 Teachers' trade unions in the United Kingdom
 Trade Union and Labour Party Liaison Organisation
 UK labour law

Key - Asterisk after name = Trade unions known to the Certification Officer but not applying to be included in the list for 31 March 2014

Notes

References
E McGaughey, 'Democracy or Oligarchy? Models of Union Governance in the UK, Germany and US' (2017) ssrn.com

External links
 Certification Officer

Trade unions
United Kingdom
Trade unions

es:Trade union